John Komnenos or Comnenus may refer to:
 John Komnenos (Domestic of the Schools) (c. 1015 – 1067), Byzantine general and progenitor of the Komnenian dynasty
 John Komnenos (parakoimomenos) (c. 1070 – after 1118), Byzantine nobleman and official
 John II Komnenos (1087–1143), Byzantine emperor from 1118 to 1143
 John Komnenos (governor of Dyrrhachium) (fl. 1092–1106), Byzantine governor of Dyrrhachium
 John Tzelepes Komnenos, (fl. 1130–1140), Byzantine nobleman who defected to the Seljuk Turks
 John Komnenos Vatatzes (fl. 1132–1182), Byzantine general
 John Doukas Komnenos (1128–1176), military governor of Cyprus
 John Komnenos (son of Andronikos I) (1159–1185), second son and co-emperor of Andronikos I
 John Komnenos the Fat, Byzantine nobleman who attempted a usurpation in 1200
 John Komnenos Asen (fl. 1346–1363), ruler of the Principality of Valona